Patricia G. Fiero is an American politician who represented the 5th Essex District in the Massachusetts House of Representatives from 1984 to 1991.

Early life
Fiero was born on June 12, 1941, in Brooklyn. She graduated from Bucknell University and SUNY Buffalo.

Political career
Fiero was elected in a 1984 special election after Representative Richard R. Silva was elected mayor of Gloucester. She ran as an opponent of Speaker Thomas W. McGee and was one of the earliest supporters of George Keverian when he challenged McGee for Speaker. She remained in the House until she was defeated for reelection by Bruce Tarr in 1990. During her tenure, Fiero was known as one of the House's more liberal members.

Personal life
Fiero was married to Dick Kraus who also served in the Massachusetts General Court.

See also
 1985–1986 Massachusetts legislature
 1987–1988 Massachusetts legislature
 1989–1990 Massachusetts legislature

References

External links
 

1941 births
Living people
Bucknell University alumni
Women state legislators in Massachusetts
Democratic Party members of the Massachusetts House of Representatives
Politicians from Brooklyn
People from Gloucester, Massachusetts
University at Buffalo alumni
20th-century American politicians
20th-century American women politicians
21st-century American women